Crimeware is a class of malware designed specifically to automate cybercrime.

Crimeware (as distinct from spyware and adware) is designed to perpetrate identity theft through social engineering or technical stealth in order to access a computer user's financial and retail accounts for the purpose of taking funds from those accounts or completing unauthorized transactions on behalf of the cyberthief.  Alternatively, crimeware may steal confidential or sensitive corporate information.  Crimeware represents a growing problem in network security as many malicious code threats seek to pilfer valuable, confidential information.

The term crimeware was coined by David Jevans in February 2005 in an Anti-Phishing Working Group response to the FDIC article "Putting an End to Account-Hijacking Identity Theft," which was published on December 14, 2004.

Examples 
Criminals use a variety of techniques to steal confidential data through crimeware, including through the following methods:
 Surreptitiously install keystroke loggers to collect sensitive data—login and password information for online bank accounts, for example—and report them back to the thief.
 Redirect a user's web browser to a counterfeit website controlled by the thief even when the user types the website's proper domain name in the address bar, also known as pharming.
 Steal passwords cached on a user's system.
 Hijack a user session at a financial institution and drain the account without the user's knowledge.
 Enable remote access into applications, allowing criminals to break into networks for malicious purposes.
 Encrypt all data on a computer and require the user to pay a ransom to decrypt it (ransomware).

Delivery vectors 
Crimeware threats can be installed on victims' computers through multiple delivery vectors, including:
 Vulnerabilities in Web applications. The Bankash.G Trojan, for example, exploited an Internet Explorer vulnerability to steal passwords and monitor user input on webmail and online commerce sites.
 Targeted attacks sent via SMTP. These social-engineered threats often arrive disguised as a valid e-mail message and include specific company information and sender addresses. The malicious e-mails use social engineering to manipulate users to open the attachment and execute the payload.
 Remote exploits that exploit vulnerabilities on servers and clients

Concerns 
Crimeware can have a significant economic impact due to loss of sensitive and proprietary information and associated financial losses.  One survey estimates that in 2005 organizations lost in excess of $30 million due to the theft of proprietary information. The theft of financial or confidential information from corporate networks often places the organizations in violation of government and industry-imposed regulatory requirements that attempt to ensure that financial, personal and confidential.

United States 
US laws and regulations include:
 Sarbanes-Oxley Act
 Health Insurance Portability and Accountability Act (HIPAA)
 Gramm-Leach-Bliley Act
 Family Educational Rights and Privacy Act
 California Senate Bill 1386 (2002)
 Payment Card Industry Data Security Standard

See also 
 Malware
 Metasploit Project
 MPack (software), A PHP-based crimeware
 Targeted attacks
 Tiny Banker Trojan, A small banking trojan
 Phishing
 Spyware
 Zeus (malware), Perhaps the best known banking trojan

References

External links 
Symantec Internet Security Threat Report 
Computer Security Institute (Archived: August 8, 2002, at 22:18:34)
"Real-Time Hackers Foil Two-Factor Security" (Technology Review, September 18, 2009)
"Cyber Crooks Target Public & Private Schools", (Washington Post, September 14, 2009)
"Crimeware gets worse - How to avoid being robbed by your PC", (Computerworld, September 26, 2009)

Types of malware
Cybercrime